Dair (also Dabab, Daier, Thaminyi) is a moribund Hill Nubian language spoken in the northern Nuba Mountains in the south of Sudan. It was spoken by around 1,000 people in 1978 in the Jibaal as-Sitta hills, between Dilling and Delami.

References 

Nubian languages
Languages of Sudan
Severely endangered languages